Amblygobius phalaena, the Sleeper Banded goby, white-barred goby, is a species of goby native to tropical reefs of the western Pacific Ocean and through the central Indo-Pacific area at depths of from .  This species feeds by taking in mouthfuls of sand and sifting out algae, invertebrates and other organic matter.  It can reach a length of  TL.  It is also of minor importance to local commercial fisheries and can also be found in the aquarium trade.

References

External links

 

phalaena
Fish described in 1837